Loose Ends is a posthumous compilation album by American guitarist Jimi Hendrix, released in February 1974 in the UK. It was the fourth and last Hendrix studio album released posthumously by manager Michael Jeffery.  The album features a collection of outtakes and jams, with the exception of "The Stars That Play with Laughing Sam's Dice" which is the sole authorized track by Hendrix, in a new stereo mix by Eddie Kramer.

The album was engineered, mixed and compiled by John Jansen, who is listed on the record's sleeve as "Alex Trevor" because he did not wish his name to be on the album's credits. Additional engineering was provided by Eddie Kramer, Dave Palmer, Kim King, Gary Kellgren, Jack Adams, Tom Flye and Jim Robinson.

Reprise Records (Jimi Hendrix' label at the time), declined to issue this album in the US and Canada as they considered the material below standard. All the tracks on this album have been subsequently re-released on other official albums, in some form, except "Blue Suede Shoes". The UK, French, and German releases had different covers.

Track listing
All tracks written by Jimi Hendrix, except where noted.

Personnel
Jimi Hendrixguitars, lead vocals
Billy Coxbass guitar, backing vocals on "Burning Desire"
Mitch Mitchelldrums on "Come Down Hard on Me Baby", "Jam 292", "The Stars That Play with Laughing Sam's Dice", "The Drifter's Escape"
Buddy Milesdrums on "Blue Suede Shoes", "Burning Desire", "I'm Your Hoochie Coochie Man"; backing vocals on "Burning Desire", "I'm Your Hoochie Coochie Man"
Sharon Laynepiano on "Jam 292"
Noel Reddingbass guitar on "The Stars That Play with Laughing Sam's Dice"

Recording details
 "Come Down Hard on Me Baby" recorded at Electric Lady Studios in New York City on July 15, 1970
 "Blue Suede Shoes" recorded at Record Plant studios in New York City on January 23, 1970
 "Jam 292" recorded at Record Plant Studios on May 14, 1969
 "The Stars That Play with Laughing Sam's Dice" recorded at Mayfair Studios, New York City on July 18 and 29, 1967
 "The Drifter's Escape" recorded at Electric Lady Studios on June 17, 1970
 "Burning Desire" and "I'm Your Hoochie Coochie Man" recorded at Baggys in New York City on December 18 or 19, 1969
 "Have You Ever Been (To Electric Ladyland)" recorded at Record Plant Studios on June 14, 1968

Notes

References

1974 compilation albums
Jimi Hendrix compilation albums
Compilation albums published posthumously
Albums recorded at Electric Lady Studios
Polydor Records compilation albums